Ithu Nalla Thamasa is a 1985 Indian Malayalam film,  directed by Kailasnath and produced by Sreekumaran Thampi. The film stars Sukumari, Jagathy Sreekumar, Kalpana and Santhosh in the lead roles. The film has musical score by K. P. Udayabhanu.

Cast

Sukumari as Kalyaniyamma
Jagathy Sreekumar as Basheer Pilla
Kalpana as Sundari/Gracy
Santhosh as Vijayakrishnan/Kuttapppan
Anuradha as SI Prasanna
K. P. A. C. Azeez as SP J. Ashok
K. P. Ummer as Meesa Vasupilla
Nylex Nalini as Lalnamani
Poojappura Ravi as Kumaran Vaidyar
T. G. Ravi as Ouseph Muthalali
Kailasanath as Savala

Soundtrack
The music was composed by K. P. Udayabhanu and the lyrics were written by Sreekumaran Thampi.

References

External links
 

1985 films
1980s Malayalam-language films